Melbourne Victory Football Club is an Australian professional soccer club based in Melbourne, Victoria. Competing in the country's premier men's competition, the A-League Men, under licence from Australian Professional Leagues (APL), Victory entered the competition in the inaugural season as the only Victorian-based club in the newly revamped domestic Australian league.

Recognised as the most supported and second most successful club in the league to date, Victory has won four A-League Championships, three A-League Premierships, one Pre-Season Challenge Cup and two Australia Cups, the only club to have won all four domestic trophies in the modern era of Australian soccer. They have also competed in the AFC Champions League on seven occasions, most recently in 2020. Their furthest placement in the tournament was in the 2016 campaign and 2020 campaign, where they were knocked out in the Round of 16 by the eventual champion on both occasions.

The club's home ground is the Melbourne Rectangular Stadium, currently known as AAMI Park for sponsorship purposes, a 30,050-seat stadium on Olympic Boulevard in Melbourne's city centre. The Victory has previously played its home matches at other stadiums throughout Melbourne and surrounding areas, including Olympic Park Stadium, Docklands Stadium and Kardinia Park.

Although Victory is supported across the whole Melbourne metropolitan area, as well as regional cities in the state, it is based primarily in the city centre. Victory's main supporters' group is 'Original Style Melbourne'; from the Victory's first season until its disbanding in 2016, 'North Terrace' had served as Melbourne Victory's main active supporters group. The club has rivalries with Melbourne City (the Melbourne Derby), Sydney (The Big Blue), Adelaide United (The Original Rivalry), and Western United (the Westgate Derby/the Battle of the Bridge). The club's all-time leading goalscorer is Archie Thompson, with 97 goals to his name in all competitions. Leigh Broxham has the record for most matches played, with 405 appearances for the Victory.

History

Beginnings (2004–2005)

Following the demise of the National Soccer League, Australia's first national soccer first tier competition, Melbourne Victory Football Club was unveiled as Melbourne's representative of the newly established A-League, along with seven other foundation clubs on 1 November 2004. Established as an unlisted public company, inaugural chairman Geoff Lord of Belgravia Leisure Pty Ltd was the largest financial backer of the club with support from other Melbourne-based business men consisting of Ron Peck, John Harris, future chief executive officer Richard Wilson, and future chairman Anthony Di Pietro.  Despite a diverse range of owners of different industry backgrounds, the consortium managed to raise only $4.5 million of the $5 million budget minimum set by Football Federation Australia, thus resulting in the federation depositing the needed $500,000 to obtain the license with the condition of imposing one board member performing duties in the best interests of the federation to ensure return on investment.

The inaugural manager was Ernie Merrick who had signed his former Sunshine George Cross defender Kevin Muscat to be inaugural captain, alongside marquee Archie Thompson, both of whom would become legends of the soccer club in their own rite. The club's first competitive match was against Newcastle Jets on 22 July 2005 in round one of the A-League Pre-Season Challenge Cup, finishing in a 1–1 draw in Newcastle. The club's first competitive home game would also prove to be the club's first win on 30 July 2005 in a 3–0 against Perth Glory in the cup's second round at Olympic Park.

Merrick Era and early glory (2005–2011)

The league's inaugural season of 2005–06 proved to be a disappointment in conclusion but also a glimpse into the glory that would follow in 2006–07 and 2008–09 seasons, with the club being first on the ladder mid-season but ultimately finishing second last. Future team of the decade players Danny Allsopp, Leigh Broxham, Archie Thompson, Grant Brebner, Adrian Leijer, Rodrigo Vargas, Michael Theoklitos under captain Kevin Muscat and manager Ernie Merrick would achieve glory in winning its first league premiership and championship in the 2006–07 season, qualifying for its inaugural AFC Champions League. Archie Thompson in A-League history is synonymous with the glory of famously scoring the first five goals in the 6–0 grand final win over Adelaide United in front of a current record crowd for a grand final of 55'436 at Docklands Stadium. The heavy defeat for Adelaide as well as an altercation between Muscat and manager John Kosmina earlier in the season is culturally seen as the beginning of the rivalry, earning the nicknames 'the cross-border rivalry' and 'the original rivalry'.

The 2007–08 season proved to be another disappointment with Victory narrowly missing the finals. Hindered by multiple injuries throughout the season and the inexperience of time & energy management whilst trying to compete in the club's inaugural AFC Champions League campaign of 2008 at full strength, Melbourne narrowly missed the finals but the season did bring long term positives. The acquisition of future team of the decade players Carlos Hernández, Matthew Kemp, and Tom Pondeljak would ensure on-field strength for next three seasons. The 2008–09 season brought more success for the club in achieving its first treble. The last A-League Pre-Season Challenge Cup of 2008, finishing top of the ladder as premiers resulting in qualifying a second time in the AFC Champions League for the 2010 campaign, and being crowned champions after defeating Adelaide United a second time in a grand final in front of a crowd of 53,273, which as of January 2019, is still the second largest attendance for an A-League grand final behind the 2007 final. The 2009–10 season saw Victory be serious competitors for first position but would ultimately and narrowly finish behind Sydney FC, whom Victory would lose 2–4 on penalties in the grand final weeks later. It would prove to be the last grand final for manager Ernie Merrick and for Kevin Muscat as captain, with Victory finishing fifth for the 2010–11 season, and losing to Gold Coast in first round of the finals.

Exit Lord, enter Di Pietro, and the rebuild (2011–2013)

The conclusion of the 2010–11 A-League season saw inaugural president Geoff Lord resign from the club, hailing from the success of two championships, two premierships and the last pre-season challenge cup. Fruit and vegetable heavyweight and shareholder Anthony Di Pietro became the second president in the club's history, hired internally after being an inaugural director alongside Lord from the beginning. Di Pietro was also an occasional stand-in president when Lord was unable to perform duties due to illness on multiple occasions in 2011, making his first public speech ever being stand in chairman at the time during a Victory in Business luncheon at the Crown Palladium Ballroom. Along with the resignation of Lord, inaugural chief executive officer Geoff Miles also resigned from the club, with mortgage firm businessman, shareholder and inaugural director Richard Wilson being hired internally prior to the 2011–12 season alongside Di Pietro. Ernie Merrick would depart as coach to be replaced by Mehmet Duraković and later Jim Magilton for the 2011–12 season. Di Pietro & Wilson quickly sacked Merrick following multiple missed targets both on & off the field, with the 5–1 loss to Gamba Osaka in the 2011 AFC Champions League campaign being the last straw. Kevin Muscat had announced during the respective season that he would retire as a player, and immediately became an assistant coach replacing Aaron Healy. Along with Merrick & Healy's departures would be inaugural director of football Gary Cole, and would be replaced by former team South Melbourne and Socceroo teammate, Francis Awaritefe.

The two new-coming executives famously won the race against Sydney FC and other soccer clubs world-wide to sign Socceroos hero Harry Kewell to the club, being declared at the time 'the biggest signing in the history of Australian sport' at the time. With much anticipation for the lead up to the 2011–12 A-League season, the season proved to be a disappointment in missing the finals for the time third in the club's history. Multiple aged players, a less experienced revamped coaching team led by Mehmet Durakovic who was promoted by default that would later be replaced mid-season by Jim Magilton, and a high maintenance Harry Kewell all contributed to the team falling short on multiple match day results. Late in the season, Magilton would sign future team of the decade players Mark Milligan and Adama Traoré. Durakovic's unsung legacy on the club would be the signing of then nineteen year-old Lawrence Thomas, who would later win multiple championships with the club under Kevin Muscat. Despite the disappointment, the lessons were learned and the club would have its most improved season to date as of 2019, finishing third in the 2012–13 season from eighth in the season prior, narrowly losing the preliminary final to premiers and eventual champions Central Coast Mariners 0–1. The season started with a major sense of optimism by signing by multiple Brisbane Roar and National Soccer League premiership and championship-winning coach Ange Postecoglou on a three-year deal, revamping the playing squad with the departure of fourteen players and the signings of fifteen players, including Gui Finkler and Nathan Coe who would achieve multiple club and personal accolades respectively in their own rite in the years to come. Since the 2012–13 season, the club has never missed the finals series.

Coaching Disruptions (2013–14 season)
Prior to the season, coach Ange Postecoglou had just begun the second year of his three-year contract with the club, but had also been cited as a possible replacement for departing Australian national team coach Holger Osieck, in the lead-up to the 2014 FIFA World Cup. This possibility became a reality the day before the round three clash against Postecoglou's former club Brisbane Roar on 25 October, which was his last match in charge. Victory were denied a compensation claim of one million Australian dollars for the early departure.

Muscat era and glory again (2013–2019)

The era of Kevin Muscat becoming the first former player and captain to become manager began sooner than anticipated, but it would be an era that would restore the former early glory of Australia's biggest association football club. The era officially began following the untimely departure of Ange Postecoglou in round four of the 2013–14 season on 4 November 2013, in a 3–2 home victory over Wellington Phoenix at Docklands Stadium. Future grand final winners James Troisi, Kosta Barbarouses and Rashid Mahazi were signed to the club and would help strengthen the playing squad in the years to come. Muscat's first season would end in both heartbreak and controversy as Victory were denied obvious penalty decisions in the last minutes of both the A-League finals clash against Brisbane Roar, and in the last group stage clash against Jeonbuk in the 2014 AFC Champions League, when in both games one extra goal was needed to win. Both controversial moments occurred only days in between each other, resulting in Muscat heavily criticizing referees in general.

The 2014–15 season saw a major recruiting drive in the signings of Besart Berisha, Carl Valeri, Daniel Georgievski, Fahid Ben Khalfallah and Mathieu Delpierre, who would all go onto achieve multiple personal and club accolades respectively. Late in the season on 28 March 2015, the club announced its team of the decade at the Crown palladium ballroom with five of the announced players still contracted to victory at the time, with then coach Kevin Muscat also being listed. This time of the season also saw captaincy of the club change with Adrian Leijer departing the Victory for Chinese Super League club Chongqing Lifan on an undisclosed transfer for a major salary increase, with teammate Mark Milligan becoming interim captain for the remainder of the season. After a six-year wait, Victory would finish first on the ladder and would later defeat Sydney FC 3–0 in the grand final. Team of the decade substitute goalkeeper Nathan Coe, who would miss the grand final due to injury announced his retirement shortly after the achievement.

The next two seasons were of mixed results, but the squad would remain competitive and be rewarded. The 2015–16 season was of mixed results in the A-League, but the squad would win the 2015 FFA Cup, and for the first time in the club's history, would progress to the round of sixteen in the Asian Champions League. Captain and marquee Mark Milligan departed the club during the preseason and was replaced by 2014 World Cup teammate Oliver Bozanic, with Carl Valeri given the captaincy role. Defender Thomas Deng would be promoted from the youth squad and feature occasionally throughout the season. Veterans Mathieu Delpierre and Archie Thompson retired at the season's conclusion and Deng would be loaned to Jong PSV, but the season would be mostly remembered for newly promoted captain Carl Valeri contracting a brain inflammation in December 2015, but would later return in the finals. The 2016–17 season saw an improvement in results in the A-League, with the squad finishing second on the ladder, ultimately losing in what was a demoralising defeat in the grand final to their superior rivals and premiers Sydney FC, making both clubs equal in premierships and championships. The season saw the returns of James Troisi and team of the decade winger Marco Rojas. Defender James Donachie joined from Brisbane Roar, and the club's youth squad would promote Christian Theoharous and Stefan Nigro.

The 2017–18 season ended in glory but would see multiple difficulties in the lead up to the finals. In the preseason, 2017 grand final Johnny Warren medalist Daniel Georgievski departed the club willfully, with Marco Rojas and Nick Ansell both being sold. Rhys Williams and Leroy George signed in the preseason and would prove to be crucial players. With mixed results throughout the season, coach Kevin Muscat was criticized for his 'stale' game plan. Mid-season, captain Mark Milligan and defender Jason Geria would both be sold, and Terry Antonis would join the club on a two and a half-year deal. Despite pressure, the squad gained form towards the end of the season despite losing to premiers Sydney FC away at Sydney Football Stadium in the last round and finished fourth. Victory would beat Adelaide United in the elimination final 2–1, led by future coach Marco Kurz at Melbourne Rectangular Stadium, to then face Sydney FC in the semi final away. In the lead up to the clash, Sydney captain Alex Brosque told [the [Sydney Morning Herald]] when asked regarding the reverse fixture with victory that "I know they'll be thinking about it as much as they'll try to forget about it." also stating that "It gives us a lot of confidence and psychologically I'm sure it will be playing on their minds,". In the warm up of the game, crucial defender Rhys Williams suffered an ankle injury that would rule him out of the game and the grand final if Victory would win. The Victory as underdogs would beat Sydney 3–2 in extra time, with victory physically scoring all five goals, with own goals by Stefan Nigro and Terry Antonis. Despite the unfortunate error, Nigro's efforts in the match being a late replacement for the injured Williams would secure him a start in the grand final. Antonis, a former youth product and five seasoned player of Sydney, conceded the own goal in the last minute of regular time to bring the score to 2–2, leading to extra time. In the 117th minute, loanee teammate Kenny Athiu would pass the ball to Antonis, surviving three tackle attempts in running from the center line to within Sydney's eighteen yard box to score the winning goal, in what would later be recognized as the club's 2017–18 goal of the season. Victory would travel to Newcastle to face second placed Newcastle Jets, led by former and inaugural Victory manager Ernie Merrick. It would be the A-League's first ever regional grand final as well as one manager versing his former player as a manager in a grand final, and would be remembered for its controversy. Victory scored the earliest ever goal in a grand final from a Leroy George free kick that would be headed into the center of the eighteen yard box by James Donachie then scored by Kosta Barbarouses in the ninth minute. Replays had shown that Donachie was offside upon George kicking the ball, but with the views of the linesman deceived by a Newcastle defender, the goal was allowed to stand as the video assistant referee had temporarily failed. Victory would win 1–0 against a ten men Newcastle after striker Roy O'Donovan desperately attempted to volley a high altitude ball from a free kick that infamously resulted in goalkeeper Lawrence Thomas being kicked in the face causing an altercation to follow. The incident resulted in a ten match ban for O'Donovan going into the 2018–19 season despite an appeal. Thomas later told The Guardian that he had accepted O'Donovan's immediate apology after full-time. The achievement made Victory leaders in the number of championships won by an A-League club, as well as being the first team to win a grand final after finishing fourth place in the regular season, the lowest ladder position. Weeks later, six grand final players departed the club, including Besart Berisha being sold for an undisclosed fee to Sanfrecce Hiroshima.

Despite the unexpected grand final achievement, Muscat would commence a recruiting drive that would see eight players join preseason, including 2018 World Cup players and Keisuke Honda and Ola Toivonen. Mid-season transfers saw the undisclosed sale of Nick Ansell, and the recruitment of Elvis Kamsoba and Anthony Lesiotis, this first ever former Melbourne City player to represent Victory. Despite being more competitive than the season prior considering that Honda was sidelined more over a third of the season with injury, it would ultimately end in disappointment. The squad would finish third by one point behind the second placed and eventual champions Sydney FC, meaning that Victory would not receive direct entrance into the group stage of the 2020 AFC Champions League, but would have to enter a play-off first. The true realization of the disappointment in finishing third would be realized in the semi-final against Sydney away, who would exact revenge for their 2017–18 semi final upset in which Victory were defeated 1–6 away. Despite having one more season on his contract, Muscat resigned from the club weeks later for personal reasons, closing a fourteen-year stint at the club as a player, captain, assistant manager, and head coach.

Post-Muscat era (2019–2021)
Following Muscat's early departure, the Melbourne Victory board interviewed multiple foreign and local coaches for the senior role. It was announced in late June 2019 that former Adelaide United coach Marco Kurz was signed on a two-year deal. During the recruitment process, nine players departed the club, including the retirement of captain Carl Valeri who would become an office administrator for the club. Eight senior players were signed including the return of team of the decade defender Adama Traoré, and the youth academy had promoted defensive players Benjamin Carrigan and Brandon Lauton. In early October, weeks before the first round of the 2019–20 season, Ola Toivonen was appointed captain.

In January 2020, after just 6 months in the role Kurz was dismissed by the club. Kurz left having managed the Victory for just thirteen competitive matches, for four wins, three draws and six losses. The six defeats were the most losses the Victory had suffered after thirteen games of a season. At the time of his dismissal, the Victory were sixth on the league ladder with fifteen points, their equal lowest points tally after thirteen games alongside the 2007–08 and 2011–12 seasons. Assistant coach Carlos Pérez Salvachúa was appointed as caretaker manager of the Victory until the conclusion of the season. However, on 30 May 2020, with 5 regular season A-League matches remaining in Melbourne Victory's season, Salvachúa departed the club to return to Europe to be closer to his family. Assistant coach and former player Grant Brebner was appointed as the Victory's caretaker manager for the remainder of the season; he was later appointed promoted to permanent manager on 24 August 2020.

Brebner's tenure as Melbourne Victory manager coincided with the worst run of results in Melbourne Victory's history. He was sacked as head coach shortly after Victory's 7–0 loss to local rivals Melbourne City in April 2021, a result which came only a month and a half after losing 6–0 to the same team. On 19 April 2021, Victory assistant coach Steve Kean was appointed as interim coach for the remainder of the 2020–21 A-League season as Victory plummeted to 12th place, becoming the first ever A-League side to finish 12th and Victory won their first ever wooden spoon.

Popovic era (2021–present)

On 22 April 2021, the Victory announced that Tony Popovic will take over as the club's manager from the beginning of the 2021–22 season. On 5 February 2022, the Victory defeated the Central Coast Mariners 2-1 at AAMI Park to win the 2021 FFA Cup, achieving Popovic's first trophy as manager of the club, as well as the Victory's second FFA Cup title. This was the last edition of the competition under the FFA Cup name; from 2022, the competition will be known as the Australia Cup.

In the lead up to the 2022–23 A-League Men season, the club announced the signing of former Manchester United and Portugal national team great Nani on Tuesday 12 July 2022, on a two-year contract, and was allocated the number seventeen jersey. On the following Friday 15 July 2022, the club played against Manchester United at the Melbourne Cricket Ground, as participant in United's 2022 pre-season tour of East Asia. Nani made his unofficial debut as substitute in front of the 74,157 spectators present, with the match finishing in 1–4 loss.

Colours and badge
Melbourne Victory's colours are navy blue, white and silver, which encompass the traditional state sporting colours of Victoria. The club's home kit is traditionally all-navy blue, with a white chevron design. Known colloquially as the "big V", it is a symbol associated with the Victoria Australian rules football team. The Victory's away kits have often featured a reversed colour scheme, with white shirts, shorts and socks, alongside a navy blue chevron. Grey and fluorescent yellow have both featured as away kit colours as well.

Currently, the home kit consists of a navy blue shirt with a chevron which fades from white at the bottom to navy blue at the top, paired with navy blue shorts and socks. The away kit is all white, with the shirt featuring a yoke consisting of a design reminiscent of the club's home ground AAMI Park, set inside an off-centre chevron.

A new kit was introduced for the 2008 AFC Champions League due to AFC rules requiring kits to have player numbers on the front of the uniform as well as the back, which would not fit well with the 'V' on the Victory's regular kit. For the 2009–10 season, Melbourne changed their away shirt to be a reverse of their home shirt; white with a blue chevron. In 2010, Melbourne wore the TAC 'seatbelt' shirt against Perth Glory in a charity event to raise awareness for the necessary use of seat belts in cars. Adidas were announced as the club's official kit manufacturer for five years beginning in the 2011–12 season, after the initial deal for Reebok to supply all A-League clubs had expired. The new kits were announced via the club's YouTube channel, and featured a controversial change to a fluoro yellow away shirt. For their 2013–14 kits, Melbourne Victory received backlash from supporters, as the away kits featured a much lighter blue, bearing a large resemblance to fierce rivals Sydney FC.

Kit evolution

 Home

 Away

Sponsorship
On 5 December 2005, South Korean electronics giant Samsung became the club's major sponsor in a two-year deal, giving Samsung logo placement on the front and the back of Victory's home and away kits. Prior to the 2006–07 season, KFC were announced as Victory's sleeve sponsor, with their logo appearing on the sleeve of Victory's home and away kits. On 28 January 2009, Samsung announced that they would not renew their sponsorship for the 2009–10 A-League season. Intralot became the Melbourne Victory's new major sponsor when they signed a two-season $2 million contract on 4 May 2009. Their logo subsequently featured on the front of Melbourne Victory's playing strip, starting from the 2009–10 season. On 6 August 2010, it was announced that law firm Florin Burhala Lawyers would be Melbourne Victory's official shorts sponsor for the 2010–11 season. On 1 June 2011, it was announced that human resources company Adecco Group signed a three-year deal as the club's major sponsor, replacing Intralot. As part of the deal, Adecco's logo appeared on the front of the club's playing strip. Melbourne Victory announced on 16 June 2011 that they had signed a five-year deal with global sportswear giant Adidas as the club's official kit manufacturer.

Club songs
A number of different songs have become synonymous with Melbourne Victory, being both sung by supporters and played over the PA at different moments before, during and after games.

"Stand By Me" by Ben E. King. This is sung as the team enters the pitch prior to kick-off, with fans holding their scarves above their heads throughout.
"Seven Nation Army" by The White Stripes. The chorus melody is chanted as a goal celebration, with fans waving their scarves in the air as they sing. It has also been adapted as a player chant for former striker Besart Berisha.
"Victory The Brave", a rearrangement of Scotland The Brave, penned by Jim Keays of The Masters Apprentices, with Glenn Wheatley helping to compose the song. This song is played after every home win.
"Freed from Desire" by Gala. In January 2022, Melbourne Victory ran a fan poll to choose a post-match victory song to be played after every Melbourne Victory home win; Freed from Desire received the most votes in the post, becoming the post-match victory song of the club, with the song played after the conclusion of Victory the Brave.

Stadiums

Melbourne Victory currently plays all of its home games at Melbourne Rectangular Stadium, known as AAMI Park for sponsorship purposes.

Olympic Park Stadium
The club was originally based at the 50-year-old Olympic Park Stadium, where they played all home matches during the 2005–06 A-League season. This stadium had seated areas only on the wings, with standing-room sandy terraces on the north and south ends. The average crowd during the first year was 14,158, 77% of its capacity of 18,500. As a result, the match-day atmosphere would prove to be a marketing asset not just for Melbourne Victory, but also for the rest of the league. It also proved to be a major factor in the club's decision to relocate home games to Docklands Stadium, then known as 'Telstra Dome', from the 2006–07 season onwards, for both safety reasons, and simplicity in membership and match-day attendance expansion. Despite the club permanently relocating to Docklands Stadium, the venue was still used occasionally for both the 2006–07 and 2007–08 seasons, until being permanently closed in 2009.

Docklands Stadium

On 2 September 2006, Melbourne Victory played its first ever match against Sydney FC at the 56,000 capacity Marvel Stadium in a 3–2 victory. The match proved to be a runaway success in terms of crowds, with 39,730 in attendance. As a result, the club moved all but one of their home games to the ground. This move to such a large stadium proved to be an outstanding success, with the Grand Final held there. The average attendance rose to 27,728 for the 2006–07 season, 10,000 above the next highest in the A-League.

During the construction of the Melbourne Rectangular Stadium, Marvel Stadium continued to serve as the club's only home ground until the completion of the club's new permanent home, which began hosting games from the 2010–11 A-League season. On 11 March 2016, it was announced that th club had committed to a further lease of 10 years for the continued use of limited blockbuster matches at the venue, ending at the conclusion of the 2026–27 season. This agreement was mutually ended in July 2021, when the club announced it would no longer play any further home matches at Docklands Stadium and would play every future home match at Melbourne Rectangular Stadium.

To date, Melbourne Victory have celebrated the 2006–07 and 2008–09 premiership and championship victories at the venue. The stadium was also the permanent venue and operational base of the club during the 2008 Pre-Season Cup, although the grand final was won in Wellington, New Zealand.

Melbourne Rectangular Stadium

Prior to the 2006–07 season the club had planned to move to a new $190 million stadium being built to the east of the current Olympic Park complex. The new stadium was originally expected to sit approximately 20,000 spectators (expandable to 25,000) and was to be completed by 2009.

These plans were revised after the Victory refused to commit to playing at such a small capacity stadium. On 23 May 2007, the club announced it had signed as a founding co-tenant of the new stadium, which would now be built to accommodate a maximum of 30,050 spectators with further renovations to 50,000 possible. However, further expansion in the near-term is unlikely as it was discovered during Australia's World Cup Bid process that to build such an expansion would be prohibitively expensive.

Today, the venue is the home of the club's operations, administration, and the majority of the senior team's home matches, as well as occasional home matches of the NYL/NPL & W-League teams. The club currently holds the highest attendance of any association football (soccer) match played at the venue, and second overall for any sporting event at the venue. The record was set in the 2015 A-League Grand Final on 17 May 2015, with an attendance of 29,843 witnessing Melbourne win its third title, and first at the venue in the club's history. The venue was also the place of celebration with club celebrating the 2014–15 premiership and the 2015 FFA Cup victories.

Kardinia Park

On 22 August 2007, the club played its first competitive match at Kardinia Park, then known as GMHBA Stadium, against Newcastle Jets in the 2007 Pre-Season Cup.

On 15 February 2014, Melbourne Victory was forced to play at the Geelong-based stadium, in playing their Asian Champions League qualifying game against Muangthong United at Simonds Stadium due to AAMI Park and Marvel Stadium being unavailable.

Prior to the start of the 2014–15 season, Melbourne Victory signed a three-year deal to play one home game a year at the venue for the 2014–15, 2015–16 and 2016–17 seasons. In January 2017, the deal was extended to the conclusion of the 2018–19 season.

Support

In 2007 Melbourne Victory had the largest supporter base in Australia.

In January 2011, the Horda group was suspected to have stolen a banner from Melbourne Heart's Yarraside active group. In the following games, Horda banners were banned, which led to great protest from the Northern Terrace active members. At the following games, there was an increase in police and security present at the active area. Fans that were perceived as being "too aggressive" were escorted from the terrace, and in some cases fined or banned from the terrace. This led to the fans' anger escalating as they protested against the police control. On 2 February 2011, the fans from the North Terrace organised a silent protest for the Melbourne Victory – Newcastle Jets match. They left the North Terrace empty, and had a banner saying "No fans no past no future – without us you are nothing", "NT United". The banner was later confiscated by the police.

In February 2011, Victoria Police said they were reluctant to cover Melbourne Victory games because of behaviour by fans that they claimed was unacceptable. Problems included violence, anti-social behaviour and the lighting of flares.

On 3 January 2014, Football Federation Australia charged both Melbourne Victory and Western Sydney Wanderers with bringing the game into disrepute following violent fan behaviour before and during their game on 28 December 2013.

A large supporter group called Back Row Melbourne (BRM) began in 2017. However it was short lived, ending in early 2019.

In the 2019/20 season, Original Style Melbourne (OSM) was founded, attempting to recreate the old North Terrace culture. with organised marches, drums, flags, and banners. OSM even contains members who are from Horda, Nomadi, and the old North Terrace.

Notable supporters
Brad Green
Denis Napthine
Eddie Betts
George Calombaris
Laura Pausini
Ted Baillieu

Rivalries

Melbourne City (Melbourne Derby): Melbourne Victory's local rival is Melbourne City, which entered the competition in the 2010–11 season (as Melbourne Heart, before the name change in 2014), becoming the 2nd club in Melbourne. The rivalry reached a whole new level when Victory skipper Kevin Muscat was red carded for a tackle on Heart player Adrian Zahra. Currently six former Victory players have switched to Melbourne Heart (City), with Mate Dugandžić doing the first ever direct switch from Victory to City in 2011. Anthony Lesiotis is currently the only play to have ever gone the other way (City to Victory). In the 2020-21 A-League season, City beat Victory 6–0 at Marvel Stadium, then 7–0 in the return leg at AAMI Park, with striker Jamie Maclaren scoring 5 goals in the latter, along with former Victory player Andrew Nabbout scoring the opener. The 40th Melbourne Derby on 17 December 2022 was unprecedented in its volatility, with the match marred with poor crowd behaviour, including multiple flares ignited and thrown onto the pitch by supporters of both teams. In the 20th minute of the match, Melbourne City goalkeeper Tom Glover threw back a flare sent from the crowd, sparking a pitch invasion which saw both Glover and referee Alex King assaulted by pitch invaders, and causing the match to be abandoned. In response Football Australia implemented interim sanctions closing active supporter bays for both clubs for all matches up to and including 15 January 2023.
Sydney FC (The Big Blue): Sydney is considered Melbourne's major interstate rival, due to Melbourne and Sydney being Australia's two largest cities (see Melbourne-Sydney rivalry). Matches between the two teams are regularly controversial and bitter encounters. Strong tensions are also emerging between the supporters from opposing teams, evident in the sell-out crowds. The rivalry between the two teams escalated further after Sydney beat Melbourne in the final match of the 2009–10 season to win the A-League Premiership, and again beat Melbourne in the 2010 A-League Grand Final. However, in season 2014/15, Victory reversed these defeats, by first pipping Sydney to the A-League Premiership during the league season and weeks later beat them in the 2015 A-League Grand Final. This rivalry is also known as "The Big Blue". In the 2016/17 grand final, Melbourne Victory succumbed to a 4–2 penalty shootout defeat to Sydney FC (losing to Sydney in a penalty shootout for the second time). Victory avenged that loss on 28 April 2018 in a semifinal encounter with their old rivals with a 117th minute extra time strike from Terry Antonis to win 3–2 on the night. Since then Victory had 2 wins to Sydney's 1, before the 'sky blue' beat them 6–1 in the 2nd semi-final of 2018–19 a-league season in what has been called, 'The Mother's Day Massacre'.
Adelaide United (The Original Derby / The Original Rivalry):  Melbourne Victory also has a rivalry with Adelaide United. This rivalry stems from the other football codes, where the interstate rivalry is big between Victorians and South Australians (see South Australia-Victoria rivalry). There have also been altercations between sets of opposing fans in Melbourne and Adelaide. The rivalry has built up from previous encounters, when an incident between the then Adelaide United manager, John Kosmina, and Victory skipper Kevin Muscat took place during a sideline altercation during a match in the 2006–07 season, and when Victory striker Ney Fabiano spat in the direction of Adelaide defender Robert Cornthwaite during Round 4 in the 2008–09 season.  Fabiano was banned for nine matches; but this was reduced to six after a successful appeal. Victory and Adelaide contested both the 2006–07 and 2008–09 Grand Finals, with Melbourne winning both.
Western United (The Westgate Derby / The Battle of the Bridge): Melbourne Victory has developed a rivalry with Western United, which entered the competition in the 2019–20 season, becoming the 3rd club in Melbourne. Despite the rivalry's short existence, it has garnered a reputation for producing talking points, controversy, tension, goals and drama. In the team's first meeting, in November 2019 at Marvel Stadium, Western United won 3-2 despite going 2-0 down within the first 7 minutes. In February 2021 at Marvel Stadium, despite conceding the first goal of the match and despite being reduced to 10 men for the final half-hour of the match, Western United won 4–3, with Victor Sanchez scoring in the final minute of stoppage time. For the first 5 meetings between the two teams, Western United had 4 wins and a draw. On 28 May 2021, Melbourne Victory ended their losing run against Western United in emphatic fashion, winning 6–1 at AAMI Park. Currently six former Victory players have played for Western United (four have played for the Victory senior team, two have represented the Victory's youth or NPL teams without making an appearance for the senior team).

Players

First team squad

Youth

Players to have been featured in a first-team matchday squad for Melbourne Victory.

Corporate

Melbourne Victory Football Club has been & is currently owned by unlisted public company 'Melbourne Victory Ltd', since its inception. 
Ownership of the holding company consists of many minor shareholders from the city of Melbourne, with shareholders consisting of Premier Fresh Australia chief executive Anthony Di Pietro, owners of Metricon and U.S. Triestina the Biasin family, and Miami based private investment firm 777 partners. Despite the diverse shareholding by local families from Melbourne to Venture Capitalists, the club is not a "for profit" business, and as such the shareholders have never taken a dividend.

Prior to the establishment of the A-League Men, the newly established club struggled to raise the initial $5 million equity capital to join the League in its first season, resulting in Football Australia contributing approximately $500,000 to secure the club's position in the league, with the eventual intention to sell it's stake. As a result, the federation took a ten per cent holding in the club in return, as well as having a representative on the Victory board. From humble beginnings, the club has become a commercial success, with the clubs value increasing from 19.2 million AUD in November 2014 to 40 million in 2018, with the most recent evaluation being 50 million AUD following the 2022 partial purhcase of the club by 777 Partners.

Personnel

Current technical staff

Board members
Chairman: Anthony Di Pietro
Managing Director: Caroline Carnegie
Director:
Director: John Harris
Director: John Dovaston
Director: Joseph Mirabella

Managerial history

* Italic denotes caretaker head coach.

Club captains

Honours

Domestic

A-League

 A-League Men Premiership
Winners (3): 2006–07, 2008–09, 2014–15
Runners-up (3): 2009–10, 2016–17, 2021–22
 A-League Men Championship
Winners (4): 2007, 2009, 2015, 2018
Runners-up (2): 2010, 2017

Cups
Australia Cup
Winners (2): 2015, 2021
A-League Pre-Season Challenge Cup
Winners (1): 2008

Doubles and Trebles
Doubles
A-League and A-League Grand Final (3): 2006–07, 2008–09, 2014–15
Trebles
A-League, A-League Grand Final and A-League Preseason Cup (1): 2008–09

Notable players
The following is a list of Melbourne Victory FC players who have achieved at least two of the following criteria:

Departed the club with a transfer fee
Featured in the squad of sixteen of an A-League or FFA Cup grand final victory
Had international caps for their respective country whilst playing for the club
International notoriety signing
Made over five appearances in an A-League premiership winning season

Made over fifty appearances across all competitions
Team of the decade (2006–2015) member
Was a product of the youth academy
Winner of the A-League grand final man of the match medal, the Johnny Warren Medal
Winner of the best & fairest, the 'Victory Medal'

Australia
 Aaron Anderson
 Adrian Caceres
 Adrian Leijer
 Andrew Nabbout
 Archie Thompson
 Billy Celeski
 Birkan Kirdar
 Brendan Hamill
 Carl Valeri
 Connor Pain
 Daniel Piorkowski
 Danny Allsopp
 Diogo Ferreira
 Eugene Galekovic
 Evan Berger
 Harry Kewell
 James Troisi
 Jason Davidson
 Jason Geria
 Jesse Makarounas

 Josh Hope
 Kevin Muscat
 Kristian Sarkies
 Lawrence Thomas
 Mark Milligan
 Matthew Foschini
 Matthew Kemp
 Michael Theo
 Mitch Nichols
 Mitchell Langerak
 Nathan Coe
 Nick Ansell
 Nick Ward
 Oliver Bozanic
 Rashid Mahazi
 Robbie Kruse
 Rodrigo Vargas
 Scott Galloway
 Sebastian Ryall

 Simon Storey
 Steve Pantelidis
 Terry Antonis
 Thomas Deng
 Tom Pondeljak
Brazil
 Alessandro
 Fred
 Guilherme Finkler
 Ney Fabiano
Costa Rica
 Carlos Hernández
 José Luis López Ramírez
England
 James Robinson
France
 Matthieu Delpierre

Ivory Coast
 Adama Traoré
Japan
 Keisuke Honda
Kosovo
 Besart Berisha
Netherlands
 Leroy George
New Zealand
 Jai Ingham
 Kosta Barbarouses
 Marco Rojas
 Storm Roux
North Macedonia
 Daniel Georgievski
Scotland
 Grant Brebner

South Sudan
 Kenny Athiu
Sweden
 Ola Toivonen
Thailand
 Surat Sukha
Tunisia
 Fahid Ben Khalfallah

Team of the decade

Season-by-season record

Key
DNQ = Did not qualify
DNPQ = Did not pre-qualify
NC = Tournament not contested
Pos. af. = Position in league during finals series
Pos. s. = Position in league during regular season
TBD = Tournament in progress, outcome to be determined
Tms. = Number of teams

Continental record

See also

 Melbourne Victory FC (W-League)

Notes

References

External links

 

 
A-League Men teams
Association football clubs established in 2004
Soccer clubs in Melbourne
2004 establishments in Australia